Theo is a feminine and masculine given name and nickname.

Theo may also refer to:

Geography
 Theo, Mississippi, United States, a populated place
 Théo River, a tributary of the Turgeon River in Quebec, Canada

People with the surname
 Allan Théo, French singer born Alain Rouget in 1972
 Louise Théo, French operetta singer Cécile Piccolo (1854–1922)
 Michael Theo (formerly Theoklitos) (born 1981), Australian soccer goalkeeper

Arts, entertainment, and media
 Theo (film), a 2013 film starring Dakota Johnson
 Theo, a lion in the live-action PBS Kids series Between the Lions

Other uses
 THEO (Testing the Habitability of Enceladus's Ocean), a proposed spacecraft mission
 Theo (dog) (2009–2011), a British Army bomb-detection dog awarded the 2012 Dickin Medal for bravery
 Theo Chocolate, a chocolatier in Seattle, Washington, US
 Theo, also known as "ADT", short for "theoretical loss" or "Average Daily Theoretical", a calculation used to determine gamblers' casino comps

See also
 All pages starting with "Theo"
 All pages starting with "Théo"